Leader is a British surname. Notable people with the surname include:

 Benjamin Williams Leader (1831–1923), English artist
 Bill Leader (born 1929), English record producer
 George M. Leader (1918–2013), American politician
 Guy Leader (1887–1978), American politician
 Imre Leader (born 1963), British mathematician
 Jeffery J. Leader (born 1963), American mathematician
 John Temple Leader (1810–1903), British politician and connoisseur
 Joyce Ellen Leader (born 1942), American diplomat
 Michael Leader (1938–2016), English actor
 Otis Wilson Leader, a World War II Choctaw code talker
 William Leader (1767–1828), British MP
 Zachary Leader (born 1946), American professor of English Literature